Charles Ritchie may refer to:

 Charles Ritchie (diplomat) (1906–1995), Canadian diplomat and diarist
 Charles Ritchie (priest) (1887–1958), Anglican clergyman
 Charles Ritchie, 1st Baron Ritchie of Dundee (1838–1906), British businessman and Conservative politician